Western Australia was a crown colony from its establishment in 1829 as the Swan River Colony until the advent of representative government in 1870.  During this time executive and legislative power was vested in the Governor of Western Australia, but from 1832 he had Executive and Legislative Councils to assist and advise him. The Western Australian Legislative Council met for the first time on 7 February 1832. This is a list of members of the Western Australian Legislative Council between 1832 and 1870.

Official members, 1832–1870
The Western Australian Legislative Council was initially composed of five ex officio members; that is, members by virtue of their official government positions. These official positions were: the Governor, the Commandant, the Colonial Secretary, the Surveyor-General and the Advocate-General. The Collector of Revenue was added in 1847, and the Comptroller-General in June 1852.

This is a list of official members of the Western Australian Legislative Council between 1832 and 1870. Due to gaps in official records, some dates are approximate and the list may omit some members who were acting in official positions.

Unofficial nominee members, 1839–1867
In 1839 provision was made for the addition of four non-official nominee positions on the Legislative Council. The first four nominee members were sworn in on 4 March 1839. This is a list of non-official nominee members of the Legislative Council between 1839 and 1867.

Unofficial nominee members, 1868–1870
During the 1860s there was much public debate about the possibility of instituting representative government. This culminated in June 1865 with the submission of a petition to the Legislative Council asking for a larger and partially elected Legislative Council. As a compromise, the Legislative Council sought permission to add two more nominee members. This permission was received in September 1867, but the Governor then went further by allowing the colony to informally elect six persons whom he would then nominate to the Legislative Council. The colony was divided into six districts: Perth, Fremantle, Guildford, Eastern Districts, Murray and Champion Bay. The first five of these district elected representatives who were then nominated to the Legislative Council as promised. The Champion Bay district, which had led the push for representative government, refused to participate in what it saw as a sham election, so the Governor nominated to the final seat his ally John Wall Hardey, who had polled only four votes in the Guildford district election. This arrangement prevailed until July 1870, when the Legislative Council was reconstituted under a system of representative government.

References
Except where otherwise indicated, all list data was obtained from The Western Australian Parliamentary Handbook

Members of Western Australian parliaments by term